The National Development Council (NDC) is  the policy-planning agency of the Executive Yuan of the Republic of China .

History
NDC was formed on 22 January 2014 after the merging of Council for Economic Planning and Development, Research, Development and Evaluation Commission, part of the Public Construction Commission and part of the Data Management Processing Center of the Directorate General of Budget, Accounting and Statistics.

Organizational structure
 Department of Overall Planning
 Department of Economic Development
 Department of Social Development
 Department of Industrial Development
 Department of Human Resource Development
 Department of National Spatial Planning and Development
 Department of Supervision and Evaluation
 Department of Information Management
 Regulatory Reform Center
 Secretariat
 Personnel Office
 Civil Service Ethics Office
 Budget, Accounting and Statistics Office

List of Ministers

Transportation and access
The council building is accessible within walking distance West from NTU Hospital Station of the Taipei Metro.

See also
 Executive Yuan
 Council for Economic Planning and Development
 Research, Development and Evaluation Commission

References

2014 establishments in Taiwan
Executive Yuan
Government agencies established in 2014
Councils of the Republic of China